Bertram Anderson (1505 – 14 March 1571) was an English merchant, landowner and politician who represented Newcastle-upon-Tyne and served once as Sheriff, three times as Mayor and was elected five times as MP in the House of Commons between 1553 and 1563 and was also Governor of the Merchant Adventurers of Newcastle-upon-Tyne.

Background
Anderson was the son of the Newcastle-upon-Tyne grocer and merchant Henry Anderson (c.1484–1559) and his wife, Anne Orde, the daughter of Robert Orde of Ord, Northumberland.

Career
Anderson was elected Sheriff (1543–44) and Mayor of Newcastle-upon-Tyne (1551–52, 1557–58, 1563–64), and was also Escheator of Northumberland (1555–56). He was elected to Parliament to represent Newcastle-upon-Tyne at the Parliaments of 1553, April 1554, November 1554, 1558, and 1563.

As a merchant he traded in the Baltic and with the Netherlands, and later extended his interests to coal mining. He also purchased lands in Coken and Haswell, County Durham, among other properties. He later resided at Haswell Grange, Haswell, County Durham. Like his father, he was Governor of the Merchant Adventurers of Newcastle-upon-Tyne (1551–52, 1557–58). Anderson died on 14 March 1571.

Family
Anderson married Alice Carr, the daughter of Ralph or Robert Carr of Newcastle-upon-Tyne. They had five children, including Henry (1545–1605).

Arms

Ancestry

References 

1505 births
1571 deaths
Anderson family of Newcastle-upon-Tyne
English MPs 1554
English MPs 1558
English MPs 1563–1567
English MPs 1553 (Edward VI)
English MPs 1554–1555
Mayors of Newcastle upon Tyne
Politicians from Newcastle upon Tyne
People from Haswell, County Durham